Thylactus densepunctatus is a species of beetle in the family Cerambycidae. It was described by Chiang and Li in 1984. It is known from China.

References

Xylorhizini
Beetles described in 1984